Brigitte Mertz (born 1 January 1957) is a German former swimmer. She competed in the women's 200 metre butterfly at the 1972 Summer Olympics.

References

External links
 

1957 births
Living people
German female swimmers
Olympic swimmers of East Germany
Swimmers at the 1972 Summer Olympics
Sportspeople from Rostock
German female butterfly swimmers